= Surface and Interface Analysis =

- Discipline: Chemistry
- Language: English
- Edited by: John F. Watts

Publication details
- History: 1979-present
- Publisher: John Wiley & Sons
- Frequency: Monthly
- Open access: Hybrid
- Impact factor: 1.607 (2020)

Standard abbreviations
- ISO 4: Surf. Interface Anal.

Indexing
- CODEN: SIANDQ
- ISSN: 0142-2421 (print); 1096-9918 (web)

Links
- Journal homepage; Online archive

Surface and Interface Analysis is a peer-reviewed scientific journal published by John Wiley & Sons since 1979. In thirteen issues per year, it publishes original research papers dealing with the development and application of techniques for the characterization of surfaces, interfaces and thin films. It is available both online and in print.

The current editor in chief is John F. Watts (University of Surrey).

== Impact factor and rank ==
The journal's 2020 impact factor is 1.607. It is ranked 140th out of 162 in the Physical Chemistry category.

== Highest cited papers ==
1. Research Article: 'Empirical atomic sensitivity factors for quantitative-analysis by electron-spectroscopy for chemical-analysis', Volume 3, Issue 5, 1981, Pages: 211–225, Wagner CD, Davis LE, Zeller MV, et al. Cited 1096 times.
2. Research Article: 'Calculations of electron inelastic mean free paths .2. data for 27 elements over the 50-2000-EV range', Volume 17, Issue 13, Dec 1991, Pages: 911–926, Tanuma S, Powell CJ, Penn DR. Cited 790 times.
3. Research Article: 'Calculations of electron inelastic mean free paths for 31 materials', Volume 11, Issue 11, Aug 1988, Pages: 577–589, Tanuma S, Powell CJ, Penn DR. Cited 675 times.
4. Research Article: 'Calculations of electron inelastic mean free paths .5. data for 14 organic-compounds over the 50-2000-EV range', Volume 21, Issue 3, Mar 1994, Pages: 165–176, Tanuma S, Powell CJ, Penn DR. Cited 485 times.

== Abstracting and indexing information ==
Surface and Interface Analysis is indexed by Chemical Abstracts Service, SciFinder, Scopus, and Web of Science.
